Saint-Brandan (Gallo: Saent-Medan) is a commune in the Côtes-d'Armor department of Brittany in northwestern France.

Population

Inhabitants of Saint-Brandan are called brandanais in French.

See also
Brendan
Communes of the Côtes-d'Armor department

References

External links

Mairie de Saint-Brandan (22800)

Communes of Côtes-d'Armor